Ferger Place Historic District in Chattanooga, Tennessee was so named and added to the National Register of Historic Places in 1980. "Ferger Place" was founded in 1910 as the first exclusively White gated community ("restricted private park") south of the Mason–Dixon line. Founded by two wealthy investors, the Ferger Brothers, J. Fred Ferger and J. Herman Ferger, on the outskirts of town, and surrounded by a fence to keep grazing cattle out, Ferger Place attracted higher class families including wealthy businessmen and Government officials. Off of main street in east downtown Chattanooga, this 240-acre neighborhood includes a wide spectrum of architectural styles of homes and welcomes newcomers to its safety oriented community. Making up both Morningside and Eveningside Drives, the homes reflect an array of styles ranging from 1910 through the 1930s. The Historic Neighborhood is also known for its distinct 'U' shape of 69 beautiful homes. This neighborhood was especially attractive because of the industrial revolution that spread throughout the nation at the beginning of the 20th century.

As many new styles of homes evolved, Ferger Place remained a getaway from the changing society and stayed true to its classic, post-Victorian style. Houses included porches, open rooms, high ceilings, and multiple windows.

These Post-Victorian Architectural Styles specifically included:
 Craftsman Bungalow
 Contemporary Prairie
 Four Square
 Dutch Colonial
 Cottage Tutor Revival
 Italian Renaissance
The Neighborhood represents the National Register of Historic Places in its rare architectural styles and community oriented appearance. The Neighborhood also includes a private park for residents of Ferger Place. As one enters through the original pillars on both Morningside and Eveningside Drives, they quickly arrive at great understanding of the distinct style and historic vibe that the neighborhood puts off. The Neighborhood recently celebrated its 100th Anniversary in 2010 and continues to represent the history of the City of Chattanooga.

Gallery

References
 

Buildings and structures in Chattanooga, Tennessee
Gated communities in Tennessee
Houses on the National Register of Historic Places in Tennessee
1910 establishments in Tennessee
Houses in Hamilton County, Tennessee
Neighborhoods in Chattanooga, Tennessee
Historic districts on the National Register of Historic Places in Tennessee
National Register of Historic Places in Chattanooga, Tennessee